Ambalabe is a rural municipality located in the Atsinanana region of eastern Madagascar, and belongs to the Vatomandry (district).

Economy
The economy is based on agriculture, including coffee and cacao but also rice, maize and manioc.

References

Populated places in Atsinanana